Roger Abel (born 8 April 1954) is a former international speedway rider from New Zealand.

Speedway career 
Abel won a gold medal at the Speedway World Team Cup in the 1979 Speedway World Team Cup. He was the reserve for the New Zealand team, and although unused he received the medal as one of the five named riders and was at the event ready to ride as a replacement in any heat called upon He rode in the top tier of British Speedway from 1976 to 1979, riding for various clubs.

World final appearances

World Team Cup
 1979 -  London, White City Stadium (with Ivan Mauger / Larry Ross / Mitch Shirra / Bruce Cribb) - Winner - 35pts

References 

1954 births
New Zealand speedway riders
Eastbourne Eagles riders
Reading Racers riders
Canterbury Crusaders riders
Living people
Sportspeople from Christchurch